Ari (Erich) Glas (1897 - 1973) was a German and Israeli painter, graphic designer, illustrator and photographer.

Glas was born in 1897 in Berlin, Germany under the name Erich Glas. During World War I, he served as a commando soldier and later as a pilot and an aerial photographer in the Imperial German Army. He studied at the Academy of Fine Arts, Munich and between 1919 and 1920 at the Bauhaus school in Weimar with Lyonel Feininger and Johannes Itten.
He joined "The Young Rheinland", an artistic group which was founded by Ulrich Leman. After 1926, Glas worked as an independent graphic artist in Weimar and Berlin. In addition, he taught painting and graphics. At that time, his work was influenced by Max Liebermann.
In 1934, he left Germany because of the Nazi regime and started living in Kibbutz Yagur in Israel, where he changed his first name to Ari.

His son, Gotthard, better known under the adopted name Uziel Gal, was the designer of the Uzi submachine gun.

Ari Glas died in Haifa in 1973, leaving behind a large selection of his works: paintings, photographs, engravings and prints.

External links 

Etching by Erich Glass for auction

References 

1897 births
1973 deaths
Bauhaus alumni
Israeli artists
Jewish painters
20th-century German painters
20th-century German male artists
German male painters
German Jewish military personnel of World War I
20th-century German printmakers
Jewish emigrants from Nazi Germany to Mandatory Palestine